Florent Perrier (born 26 June 1973) is a French ski mountaineer.

Perrier was born in Arêches, where he is member of the Club Multisports Arêches-Beaufort. In 2004, he joined the French national selection. In 2008, he was president of the athletes' committee of competition ski mountaineering in the Management Committee of the Union Internationale des Associations d'Alpinisme (UIAA).

Selected results 
 2004:
 1st, World Championship team race (together with Patrick Blanc)
 1st, World Championship relay race (together with Stéphane Brosse, Cédric Tomio and Patrick Blanc)
 1st, World Championship combination ranking
 2nd, World Championship single race
 2nd, World Championship vertical race
 2005:
 1st, World Cup race in Salt Lake City
 1st, European Championship team race (together with Grégory Gachet)
 2nd, European Championship vertical race
 2nd, European Championship single race
 4th, European Championshiprelay race (together with Bertrand Blanc, Grégory Gachet and Tony Sbalbi)
 2006:
 1st, Swiss Championship vertical race
 2nd, World Championship team race (together with Grégory Gachet)
 2nd, World Championship relay race (together with Bertrand Blanc, Grégory Gachet and Stéphane Brosse)
 3rd, World Championship vertical race
 2007:
 1st, European Championship single race
 1st, European Championship vertical race
 1st, European Championship team race (together with Grégory Gachet)
 1st, European Championship combination ranking
 2nd, Trofeo Mezzalama (together with Grégory Gachet and Patrick Blanc)
 4th, World Cup
 2008:
 1st, World Championship single race
 1st, World Championship vertical race
 1st, World Championship team race (together with Alexandre Pellicier)
 1st, World Championship combination ranking
 2nd, World Championship long distance race
 3rd, World Cup race, Val d'Aran
 2009:
 4th, European Championship single race
 6th, Alexandre Pellicier team race (together with Alexandre Pellicier)
 6th, European Championship combination ranking
 9th, European Championship vertical race
 2010:
 1st, World Championship team race (together with Didier Blanc)
 2nd, World Championship combination ranking
 3rd, World Championship vertical race
 3rd, World Championship relay race (together with Didier Blanc, William Bon Mardion and Grégory Gachet)
 6th, World Championship single race
 2011:
 5th, World Championship vertical race

Pierra Menta 

 2004: 3rd, together with Grégory Gachet
 2005: 2nd, together with Grégory Gachet
 2007: 1st, together with Grégory Gachet
 2009: 3rd, together with Yannick Buffet
 2010: 2nd, together with William Bon Mardion
 2011: 7th, together with Alexandre Pellicier
 2013: 5th, together with Xavier Gachet

References 

1973 births
Living people
French male ski mountaineers
World ski mountaineering champions
Sportspeople from Savoie
21st-century French people
20th-century French people